Jal Mahal (meaning "Water Palace") is a palace in the middle of the Man Sagar Lake in Jaipur city, the capital of the state of Rajasthan, India. The palace was originally constructed in 1699; the building and the lake around it were later renovated and enlarged in the 18th century by Maharaja Jai Singh II of Amber.

The Palace

The Jal Mahal palace is an architectural showcase of the Rajput style of architecture (common in Rajasthan) on a grand scale. The building has a picturesque view of Man Sagar Lake, but owing to its seclusion from land is equally the focus of a viewpoint from the Man Sagar Dam on the eastern side of the lake in front of the backdrop of the surrounding Nahargarh ("tiger-abode") hills. The palace, built in red sandstone, is a five-storied building, of which four floors remain underwater when the lake is full and the top floor is exposed. One rectangular Chhatri on the roof is of the Bengal type. The chhatris on the four corners are octagonal. The palace had suffered subsidence in the past and also partial seepage (plaster work and wall damage equivalent to rising damp) because of water logging, which have been repaired under a restoration project of the Government of Rajasthan.

The hills surrounding the lake area, towards the north east of Jaipur, have quartzite rock formations (with a thin layer of soil cover), which is part of the Aravalli hills range. Rock exposures on the surface in some parts of the project area have also been used for constructing buildings. From the northeast, the Kanak Vrindavan valley, where a temple complex sits, the hills slope gently towards the lake edge. Within the lake area, the ground area is made up of a thick mantle of soil, blown sand, and alluvium. Forest denudation, particularly in the hilly areas, has caused soil erosion, compounded by wind and water action. As a result, silt built up in the lake incrementally raises the lake bed.
On the terrace of the palace, a garden was built with arched passages. At each corner of this palace semi-octagonal towers were built with an elegant cupola.

The restoration works of the early 2000s were not satisfactory and an expert in the field of similar architectural restoration works of Rajasthan palaces examined the designs that could decipher the originally existing designs on the walls, after removing the recent plasterwork. Based on this finding, restoration works were re-done with traditional materials for plastering – the plaster consists of partly organic material: a mortar mix of lime, sand and surkhi mixed with jaggery, guggal and methi powder. It was also noticed that there was hardly any water seepage, except for a little dampness, on the floors below the water level. But the original garden, which existed on the terrace had been lost. Now, a new terrace is being created based on a similar roof garden of the Amer Palace. The building is located near the shoreline of a lake with a maximum depth of 15 ft. As the four stories of the building are built under the water, this means it would be structured on the bottom of the lake.

The Royal family chhatris and cenotaphs
At Gaitore opposite the lake are chhatris and cenotaphs erected over cremation platforms of some of the Kachwaha rulers of Jaipur. They were built by Jai Singh II within landscaped gardens. The cenotaphs are in honor of Pratap Singh, Madho Singh II and Jai Singh II among others. Jai Singh II's cenotaph is made of marble and has impressive intricate carvings. It has a dome with 20 carved pillars.

Restoration works

Rajasthan Tourism Development Corporation took matters in its hands in the year 2004, and decided to try and restore the monument to its original glory. They signed an agreement with Jal Mahal Resorts, granting it a 99-year lease to develop 100 acres along the Man Sagar Lake (in the middle of which Jal Mahal stands) and the palace. The 99-year lease was given out to a business tycoon, Navratan Kothari Chairman KGK Group. For the past 9 years, he has worked on the cleaning of the lake and restoration of the Palace. Now there are many inhabitants of the area and it has created a great job opportunity for the people of Jaipur and Rajasthan. For the future, Navratan plans to build a few hotels around the Jal Mahal and make it a very popular tourist destination.

Joint sector project

The Lake restoration project of the Man Sagar Lake area with an estimated investment of ₹150 crores (considered one of the largest and unique such projects in India) has evolved a plan that has diverse project components. Consequently, there are many project stakeholders and beneficiaries. The project stake holders are: the Government of Rajasthan and their subordinate organizations such as the Public Works Department (PWD), Rajasthan Urban Development Authority (RUIDP), the Jaipur Development Authority (JDA – the nodal agency for implementation of all aspects of the project), the Department of Tourism, Rajasthan Project Development Fund (RPDF) and the Rajasthan Tourism Development Corporation (RTDC) and an Empowered Committee on Infrastructure Development (ECID); the Central Government organizations associated for planning and financing are the Ministry of Environment and Forests (MOE&F) through its National River Conservation Program (NRCP) and ILFS.

The Private Sector Developer (PSD) appointed was M/s KGK Consortium. Under the public-private sector partnership model approved by the EICD, PDCOR had prepared the Detailed Project Report (DPR) for the restoration of Man Sagar Lake, Jal Mahal restoration and lake precincts development.

The studies indicated two approaches to tackle the environmental degradation that had occurred in the lake, namely, dealing with natural catchment area and concurrently addressing the serious problem of municipal sewerage emerging from large scale urbanization or human settlement. Keeping this broad planning approach in view, under the lake restoration project, the works undertaken involved were: the re-alignment of city drains, de-silting of the lake, construction of artery road from Amber to Man Sagar Dam (about ), construction of check dam in a  length with silt removed from the lake, creation of three nesting islands for migratory birds, lakefront promenade in), afforestation and treatment of forest area portion of lake catchment, plantation to stabilise the slopes of bank formation. Afforestation envisaged plantation of local plant species such as Acacia arabica (desi babool) and
Tamarix indica (planting close to the water edge where they can grow well), Terminalia arjuna (Arjun) poplar, neem and all species of Ficus, which would provide diversity in vegetation and also better habitat diversity for feeding by birds and wildlife.

In addition, to remove eutrophication of the lake water and improve its water quality, in-situ Bioremediation process with 140 diffusers & 5 air compressors to aerate and create an inversion of the lake bed and stored water was also envisaged. The city sewage, which supplied 7.0 MLD of untreated sewage was treated with Sewerage Treatment Plant (STP) and then led to the lake to maintain its water level, after due removal of nutrients through tertiary treatment. This process involved diversion of the Brahampuri Nala into the Nagtalai Nala by a lined channel to its south. This was then led through a treatment plant on site to generate secondary level effluent, which was then discharged into an artificial wetland through a hyacinth channel. For this purpose, a Physico Chemical Treatment Plant was also envisaged and the effluent from this plant was taken through artificially created wetlands in an area of ) (not only to treat the water but also to serve as natural habitat for birds) and through this process the entire eco-system is being re-generated. Vegetation generated in this process is disposed of in a compost pit near the lake.

It is also reported that about 500,000 cubic metres of silt was removed from the lake. This silt was then put to use for a strengthening of embankment and building of islands as wintering grounds for migratory birds.

After the above initial restoration works of the lake and its feeder system were mostly completed by the JDA, during 2003, private sector developers were invited to develop identified tourism components on the land adjoining the lake. After following the due process, a joint sector undertaking called the PDCOR was formed between the JDA of the Rajasthan Government and the consortia of private developers with the lead provided by M/s. KGK Enterprises. The project for tourism development was entrusted to this joint group. The tourism project entailed the development of Convention Centre and Art Gallery, Multiplex and Entertainment Centre, Craft Bazaar, Arts and Craft Village, Resort Hotels, restaurants, and food courts, public park and gardens including responsibility for restoration and maintenance of the Jal Mahal.

The interior of the Jal Mahal Palace is not open to visitors.

See also
List of lakes in India
Lake Palace

Gallery

References

Rajput architecture
Palaces in Rajasthan
Tourist attractions in Jaipur
Gardens in India
Reservoirs in Rajasthan
Palaces in Jaipur